Nebria aetolica is a species of ground beetle in the Nebriinae subfamily that can be found in Albania, Greece, and North Macedonia.

Subspecies
The species have 3 subspecies all of which can be found only in Greece:
Nebria aetolica aetolica Apfelbeck, 1901
Nebria aetolica peristerica Apfelbeck, 1901
Nebria aetolica vermionica Maran, 1938

References

Beetles described in 1901
Beetles of Europe